Glomerulopathy is a set of diseases affecting the glomeruli of the nephron.

Such diseases can include processes that are inflammatory or noninflammatory. Because the term glomerulitis exists for inflammatory conditions, glomerulopathy sometimes carries a noninflammatory implication.

References

External links 

Kidney diseases